Canada competed at the 2013 World Championships in Athletics in Moscow, Russia, from 10–18 August 2013.
A team of 45 athletes represented the country in the event.

Canada won a total of 5 medals at the event, the most ever surpassing the 1995 edition in which the country won 4 medals.

Medalists 
The following competitors from Canada won medals at the Championships

Results
(q – qualified, NM – no mark, PB – personal best, SB – season best)

Men
Track and road events

Field events

Decathlon

Women

Track and road events

Field events

Heptathlon

Athletes in italics did not race.

References

External links
IAAF World Championships – Canada

Nations at the 2013 World Championships in Athletics
World Championships in Athletics
2013